The intermediate egret, median egret, smaller egret, or yellow-billed egret (Ardea intermedia) is a medium-sized heron.  Some taxonomists put the species in the genus Egretta or Mesophoyx.  It is a resident breeder from east Africa across the Indian subcontinent to Southeast Asia and Australia.

Taxonomy
Some authorities classify the intermediate egret in its own monotypic genus, Mesophoyx, while others place it with the smaller egrets in Egretta.

There are three recognised subspecies, and these are sometimes raised in to species:

 A. i. brachyrhyncha Brehm, 1854 "yellow-billed egret" - sub-Saharan Africa
 A.i. intermedia Wagler, 1827 "intermediate egret" - Asia from the Russian Far East to Japan to India and the Greater Sundas
 A. i. plumifera Gould, 1848 "plumed egret" - eastern Indonesia, New Guinea and Australia.

A.i. intermedia differs from A.i. brachyrhyncha and A. i. plumifera by having a black bill when in breeding plumage, while A.i. plumifera has a yellow-and-pink bill and A. i. brachyrhyncha has much yellower lores and face. A further difference between the nominate subspecies and the "yellow-billed" subspecies are that the "intermediate" subspecies has black at the top of the legs compared to reddish in the yellow-billed egret.

Description
This species, as its scientific name implies, is intermediate in size between the great egret and smaller white egrets like the little egret and cattle egret, though nearer to little than great. , with all-white plumage, generally dark legs and a thickish yellow bill. Breeding birds may have a reddish or black bill, greenish yellow gape skin, loose filamentous plumes on their breast and back, and dull yellow or pink on their upper legs (regional variations). The sexes are similar.

Differences from other egrets

The non-breeding colours are similar, but the intermediate is smaller, with neck length a little less than body length, a slightly domed head, and a shorter, thicker bill. The great egret has a noticeable kink near the middle of its neck, and the top of its longer bill nearly aligns with the flat top of its head.  Close up, great egret's gape line extends behind the eye, while the intermediate's is less pointed and ends below the eye.  The intermediate tends to stalk upright with neck extended forward. The great is more patient, often adopting a sideways-leaning "one-eyed" stance.
Little egrets have yellow-soled feet and black bills. They often run after fish in shallow water. Breeding birds have long nuptial plumes on the back of their heads.

Behaviour
The intermediate egret stalks its prey methodically in shallow coastal or fresh water, including flooded fields. It eats fish, frogs, crustaceans and insects. It often nests in colonies with other herons, usually on platforms of sticks in trees or shrubs.  The typical clutch size is 2 or 3 eggs but there can be as many as 6 eggs in a clutch, the colour of the eggs is pale green, with a smooth, slightly pitted shell. Both parents incubate the eggs and they hatch after between 24 and 27 days. The eggs hatch asynchronously, after hatching the adults brood the semialtricial young for 12 days, defending the nests from aerial predators during both incubation and brooding, they crouch over the nest and raise their plumes and point their bill towards the threat. The parenst regurgitate the food to feed the young, initially onto the floor of the nest but later the chick takes the food from the parent's mouth. There may be competition for food within the brood. Pinfeathers may appear on the chicks as early as 4 days old and the young are able to leave the nest at 24 days old, although they return to be fed. Fledging occurs at around 40 sdays old and they leave the colony after 70 days. In Africa and Australia they are reported to be quite successful breeders with 96% and 88% of nests fledging at least a single chick, They are more successful in wet years than in dry years.

Gallery

References

 Birds of The Gambia by Barlow, Wacher and Disley, 
 Birds of India by Grimmett, Inskipp and Inskipp,

External links

 Species text in The Atlas of Southern African Birds

intermediate egret
Birds of Japan
Birds of East Asia
Birds of South Asia
Birds of Southeast Asia
Birds of Sub-Saharan Africa
intermediate egret
intermediate egret
Articles containing video clips
Birds of Nepal